Janaki Weds Sriram is a 2003 Indian Telugu-language romantic drama film written and directed by Anji Srinu. The film stars Rohit, Gajala, Rekha and Prema while Kaikala Satyanarayana and Ali play supporting roles. Janaki and Sriram are childhood friends who are separated. Sriram later meets Anjali who falls for him but Sriram realizes that he is still in love with Janaki. The film released on 12 September 2003.

Plot

Cast 

 Rohit as Sriram
 Gajala as Janaki
 Rekha as Anjali
 Prema
 Kaikala Satyanarayana
 Ali
 Ahuti Prasad
 Chalapathi Rao
 Narayana Rao
 L. B. Sriram
 Sudha
 Apoorva
 Deepa Vimala Sri
 M. S. Narayana
 Vizag Prasad
 Sudarshan
 Sri Naveen
 Ananth Babu

Soundtrack 
The soundtrack album consists of 8 singles composed by Ghantadi Krishna. Music was released on Surya Music.

Reception 
In his review for The Hindu, Gudipoodi Srihari called Janaki Weds Sriram a "feel-good story". He wrote that Rohit gave a satisfactory performance but Gazala stole the show. "Flexible that she is an actress, she suits any kind of role". In a more mixed review, Jeevi of Idlebrain.com felt that the story was mix of successful films like Manasantha Nuvve and Nuvve Kavali. He felt that the climax was very cinematic and unconvincing and the film got boring at times. Zamin Ryot Griddaluru Gopalrao, on the other hand, termed the film "very bad". Gopalrao opined that while story started with an interesting premise, the film lost its steam as it progressed.

References

External links 

 

2003 romantic drama films
Indian romantic drama films
2000s Telugu-language films
Films set in Rajahmundry
Films set in Hyderabad, India